Newnham is an English surname. It derives from several places of that name in England. Notable people with the name include:

 Arthur Newnham (January 1861–1941), English cricketer
 George Newnham (c. 1733 – 1800), English lawyer and politician
 Hartley Newnham, Australian countertenor
 Hubert Ernest Newnham (1886–1970), Ceylonese civil servant and politician
 Jervois Newnham (1852–1941), Anglican clergyman in Canada
 John Newnham (born 1942), Australian footballer 
 Lance Newnham (1889–1943), British soldier
 Lewis Newnham (1881–1932), South African cricketer
 Maurice Newnham (1897–1974), British flying ace of World War I 
 Nicole Newnham, American documentary film producer, writer, and director
 Obadiah Newnham (1848–1932), Anglican clergyman in Canada
 Stanley Newnham (1910–1985), English cricketer
 Tom Newnham (1926–2010), New Zealand political activist and educationalist
 William Newnham, several people

See also
Newnam (surname)

References

Surnames of English origin
English toponymic surnames